The following public artworks have been displayed in Manhattan in New York City:

 5 in 1
 107th Infantry Memorial
 Admiral David Glasgow Farragut
 Alamo
 Alma Mater
 Atlas
 Ballplayers House Frieze
 Bellerophon Taming Pegasus
 Bethesda Fountain
 Burnett Memorial Fountain
 Bust of Alexander Lyman Holley
 Bust of Giuseppe Mazzini
 Bust of Golda Meir
 Bust of Victor Herbert
 Charging Bull
 Columbus Circle globe
 Columbus Monument
 El Cid Campeador
 Delacorte Clock
 Double Check
 Eagles and Prey
 Eleanor Roosevelt Monument
 The Emperor Has No Balls
 Equestrian statue of George Washington
 Equestrian statue of José de San Martín
 Equestrian statue of José Martí
 Equestrian statue of Simón Bolívar
 Equestrian Statue of Theodore Roosevelt
 Eternal Light Flagstaff
 Event Horizon
 Eye of Fashion
 The Family
 Fearless Girl
 Four Continents
 Frederick Douglass Memorial
 The Gates
 Gay Liberation Monument
 General William Jenkins Worth Monument
 The Girl Puzzle Monument
 Bust of Johann Wolfgang von Goethe
 The Great God Pan
 Group of Bears
 Harriet Tubman Memorial
 Independence Flagstaff
 Indian Hunter
 John Howard Van Amringe
 Joie de Vivre
 Josephine Shaw Lowell Memorial Fountain
 King Jagiello Monument
 Letters and Science
 A Love Letter to Marsha
 Life Force
 Madison Square Park Fountain
 Marquis de Lafayette
 Memorial to Victims of the Injustice of the Holocaust
 Metronome
 Peace Fountain
 Prometheus
 Pulitzer Fountain
 Reclining Figure (Lincoln Center)
 Richard Morris Hunt Memorial
 La Rivière
 Robert Burns
 Romeo and Juliet
 Samuel Finley Breese Morse
 Saurien
 Seventh Regiment Memorial
 The Sphere
 Spirit of Communication
 Statue of Abraham Lincoln
 Statue of Adam Clayton Powell Jr.
 Statue of Alexander Hamilton, Central Park
 Statue of Alexander Hamilton, Columbia University
 Statue of Balto
 Statue of Benito Juárez
 Statue of Chester A. Arthur
 Statue of Christopher Columbus
 Statue of Daniel Webster
 Statue of Fiorello H. La Guardia
 Statue of Fitz-Greene Halleck
 Statue of Francis P. Duffy
 Statue of George M. Cohan
 Statue of George Washington, Wall Street
 Statue of Gertrude Stein
 Statue of Giuseppe Garibaldi
 Statue of Horace Greeley (City Hall Park)
 Statue of Horace Greeley (Herald Square)
 Statue of John Watts
 Statue of José Bonifácio de Andrada
 Statue of Mahatma Gandhi
 Statue of Philip Sheridan
 Statue of Roscoe Conkling
 Statue of Sun Yat-sen
 Statue of Thomas Jefferson
 Statue of Walter Scott
 Statue of William E. Dodge
 Statue of William H. Seward
 Statue of William Shakespeare
 Tau (1/3)
 Tau
 The Tempest
 Three Dancing Maidens
 Three-Way Piece: Points
 Throwback (1/3)
 Tightrope Walker
 Tilted Arc
 Triumph of the Human Spirit
 Union Square Drinking Fountain
 Untermyer Fountain
 USS Maine National Monument
 Giuseppe Verdi Monument
 Vessel
 The Wall
 William Cullen Bryant Memorial
 William Tecumseh Sherman
 Women's Rights Pioneers Monument

See also

 Grand Central Terminal art
 List of sculptures in Central Park
 West Harlem Art Fund

Manhattan
Public art in New York City